Clubul Sportiv Municipal București, commonly known as CSM București is a Romanian professional multi-sports club based in Bucharest.

Departments
Active branches:
Athletics
Basketball
Dancesport
Handball
Judo
Volleyball

Defunct branches:
Canoeing
Chess
Motorcycle racing 
Rugby union
Scrabble
Swimming
Tennis
Yacht racing

Teams
Active teams:
CSM București (women's handball)
CSM București (men's handball)

Defunct teams:
CSM București (rugby)
CSM București (women's volleyball)

References

External links
 Official website 

 
Sports clubs established in 2007
2007 establishments in Romania
Sports clubs in Romania
Sport in Bucharest